Lychee pork or lizhi rou (Eastern Min: liĕk-chiĕ-nṳ̆k) is a popular dish well known in Fujianese cuisine. It consists of small pieces of deep-fried pork and sliced water chestnuts served in a sweet and sour sauce. Its bright red colour is derived from red yeast rice. The sauce is now commonly made with ketchup, soy sauce and rice vinegar.

History
Lychee pork is traditionally associated with the cuisines of Fuzhou and Putian. Its creation is traced to the Tang Dynasty, and is considered to be characteristic of Min cuisine. Despite its name, the dish does not contain lychee. Its name is instead derived from the appearance of the dish in which the red and curled fried pieces of pork resemble the look of lychee skin.

The origin of the dish is attributed to a legend involving Mei, a royal consort of the Xuanzong Emperor of the Jiang clan. The consort, who hailed from Putian was said to be frequently homesick, due to the distance of the imperial court from her hometown. Lychees from Putian were said to cure her despondency, but were rarely available due to the difficulty of transporting the fruit. The consort was said to employ a chef, Jiang, who devised a recipe to cook meat so that it resembled those lychees. Mei was later killed in the Anshi Rebellion, and the chef was traditionally believed to have escaped and fled back to Fujian, bringing the dish with him.

Lychee pork in the USA 
Outside China, lychee pork forms the rudiments of some famous Chinese restaurant dishes. Chicken balls and pork balls are two familiar dishes that customers can order in North American Chinese restaurants. The offspring of Chinese immigrants opened up Chinese takeaways and restaurants, bringing the cooking skills from their hometown and modifying traditional southern Chinese cuisine (including lychee pork) to American cuisine. Today, many similarities between lychee pork and chicken/pork balls can still be found.

Additional vegetable ingredients include yams, tomatoes, and green onions. Fun fact, lychee is richer in Vitamin C, but Pork is richer in Selenium, Vitamin B1.

See also
 Sweet and sour pork
 Lap cheong

References

Fujian cuisine
Chinese cuisine
Pork dishes